Carlo Alberto Pisani Dossi (born March 27, 1849 in Zenevredo; died November 19, 1910, Cardina, Como) was an Italian writer, politician and diplomat. He belonged to the Scapigliati.

In 1892 he became a diplomat in Colombia, where he married Carlotta Borsani, with whom he had three children. He came to Athens in 1895, there developing an appreciation for archeology.

He was an atheist.
Dossi was a politician.

Quotes 
 Before I've read them, I never write my name into the books I buy, because only after that I can call them mine.
 In many endeavors to gain glory, not the goal is important, but the struggle.
 Madmen open the paths which are later traversed by the wise.
 Why do people avoid being alone? Because only few are in good company when left with themselves.
 Some open roads today so that others may pass tomorrow.
 Where the eyes willingly fall, so does the heart, and eventually the feet.

Works 
 L'altrieri. Nero su bianco (1868)
 Vita di Alberto Pisani (1870)
 Elvira, elegia (1872)
 Il regno dei cieli (1873)
 Ona famiglia de cialapponi (1873)
 Ritratti umani, dal calamajo di un mèdico (1873)
 La colonia felice (1874)
 La desinenza in A (1878)
 Gocce d'inchiostro (1880)
 Ritratti umani. Campionario (1885)
 Amori (1887)
 Fricassea critica d'arte, letteratura e storia (1906)
 Rovaniana (1944) 
 Note azzurre (1912-1964)

External links 
 Liber Liber Biblioteca 

 Opening Lines of "Vita di Alberto Pisani" in English

References 

1849 births
1910 deaths
Italian male writers
Scapigliatura Movement
Italian politicians